The Helically Symmetric Experiment (HSX, stylized as Helically Symmetric eXperiment), is an experimental plasma confinement device at the University of Wisconsin–Madison, with design principles that are intended to be incorporated into a fusion reactor. The HSX is a modular coil stellarator which is a toroid-shaped pressure vessel with external electromagnets which generate a magnetic field for the purpose of containing a plasma. It began operation in 1999.

Background 

A stellarator is a magnetic confinement fusion device which generates all required magnetic fields to confine high temperature plasma by external magnetic coils. In contrast, in tokamaks and reversed field pinches, the magnetic field is created by the interaction of external magnets and an electrical current flowing through the plasma. The lack of this large externally driven plasma current makes stellarators suitable for steady-state fusion power plants.

However, due to non-axisymmetric nature of the fields, old stellarators have a combination of toroidal and helical modulation of the magnetic field lines, which leads to high transport of plasma out of the confinement volume at fusion-relevant conditions, solved in the Wendelstein 7-X which has a better particle confinement than the expected in ITER, and achieve plasma duration of 30 minutes. This large transport in old stellarators can limit their performance as fusion reactors.

This problem can be largely reduced by tailoring the magnetic field geometry. The dramatic improvements in computer modeling capability in the last two decades has helped to "optimize" the magnetic geometry to reduce this transport, resulting in a new class of stellarators called "quasi-symmetric stellarators". Computer-modeled odd-looking electromagnets will directly produce the needed magnetic field configuration. These devices combine the good confinement properties of tokamaks and the steady-state nature of conventional stellarators.  The Helically Symmetric Experiment (HSX) at the University of Wisconsin-Madison is such a quasi-helically symmetric stellarator (helical axis of symmetry).

Device

The magnetic field in HSX is generated by a set of 48 twisted coils arranged in four field periods. HSX typically operates at a magnetic field of 1 Tesla at the center of the plasma column.  A set of auxiliary coils is used to deliberately break the symmetry to mimic conventional stellarator properties for comparison.

The HSX vacuum vessel is made of stainless steel, and is helically shaped to follow the magnetic geometry.

Plasma formation and heating is achieved using 28 GHz, 100 kW electron cyclotron resonance heating (ECRH). A second 100 kW gyrotron has recently been installed on HSX to perform heat pulse modulation studies.

Operations
Plasmas as high as 3 kiloelectronvolts in temperature and about 8/cc in density are routinely formed for various experiments.

Subsystems, diagnostics

HSX has a large set of diagnostics to measure properties of plasma and magnetic fields. The following gives a list of major diagnostics and subsystems.

 Thomson scattering
 Diagnostic neutral beam
 Electron cyclotron resonance heating system
 Electron cyclotron emission radiometers
 Charge exchange recombination spectroscopy
 Interferometer
 Motional Stark effect
 Heavy ion beam probe (coming soon)
 Laser blow-off
 Hard and soft-X-ray detectors
 Mirnov coils
 Rogowski coils
 Passive spectroscopy

Goals and major achievements

HSX has made and continues to make fundamental contributions to the physics of quasisymmetric stellarators that show significant improvement over the conventional stellarator concept. These include:
 Measuring large ion flows in the direction of quasisymmetry
 Reduced flow damping in the direction of quasisymmetry
 Reduced passing particle deviation from a flux surface
 Reduced direct loss orbits
 Reduced neoclassical transport
 Reduced equilibrium parallel currents because of the high effective transform

Ongoing experiments

A large number of experimental and computational research works are being done in HSX by students, staff and faculties. Some of them are in collaboration with other universities and national laboratories, both in the USA and abroad. Major research projects at present are listed below:

 Effect of quasi-symmetry on plasma flows
 Impurity transport
 Radio frequency heating
 Supersonic plasma fueling and the neutral population
 Heat pulse propagation experiments to study thermal transport
 Interaction of turbulence and flows in HSX and the effects of quasi-symmetry on the determination of the radial electric field
 Equilibrium reconstruction of the plasma density, pressure and current profiles
 Effects of viscosity and symmetry on the determination of the flows and the radial electric field
 Divertor flows, particle edge fluxes
 Effect of radial electric field on the bootstrap current
 Effect of quasi-symmetry on fast ion confinement

References

Additional resources

External links

 
 Experimental Tests of Quasisymmetry in HSX. Talmadge Slide 4 compares with tokamak

Stellarators
Plasma physics
University of Wisconsin–Madison